Behind the News is a 1940 American drama film starring Lloyd Nolan and directed by Joseph Santley. The film was nominated for an Academy Award for Sound Recording (Charles L. Lootens). It is also known as A Flagpole Needs a Flag.

Plot
Recently graduated journalist Jeff Flavin gets a scholarship of six months work for The Enquirer.

Upon his arrival to the paper, Jeff gets the most renowned reporter, Stuart Woodrow, as a mentor. The editor, Vic Archer, hopes this will jumpstart the old man's spark and steer him back on the road to success where he used to be.

However, the result of the pairing-up is that Jeff gets a very harsh treatment during his first time at the paper. Stu is reporting on notorious racketeer Harry "Face" Houseman, who many claim have been indicted just because the district attorney, Hardin S. Kelly, wants to be re-elected.

Everything goes wrong with the cooperation between the old and young reporters. Jeff manages to make Stu late for a date with his fiancé Barbara Shaw, who is in fact Kelly's secretary. Stu gets drunk and scolds Jeff, but when Stu is too hungover cover the story about Face escaping prison, Jeff steps in and does the job.

Jeff starts his own investigation of the case, and becomes witness to murder when Face is shot down in cold blood in his sister's apartment. He reports everything in Stu's name,  and the old reporter becomes very grateful. Stu starts caring about Jeff's future career, and is determined to get him out of newspaper reporting, since he deems it unsuitable for a decent man like Jeff.

Stu tricks Jeff to cover a fake story, and the editor is furious when he sees the result, and makes him read funny strips on radio instead of serious reporting. But when Jeff visits the court to meet one of his young listeners, he happens to watch the trial against Face's murderer, Carlos Marquez.

Since Jeff speaks Spanish he discovers that the interpreter translates the accused man's words wrong, saying that Carlos confesses to the murder although he doesn't. When Carlos is convicted of the murder, Jeff tries to correct the wrongdoing by telling his editor about it. No one takes him seriously because of the fake story he reported previously, but eventually Stu agrees to help him look into the matter.

Stu, Barbara and Jeff sneaks into the district attorney's office to look for clues. They find evidence that Kelly is corrupt and has been taking bribes for years. Together they go on to find a witness who can reveal Kelly's involvement in Face's murder and the false conviction of Carlos. When Kelly is arrested, Carlos is released. Jeff continues working as a reporter and also serves as the best man on Stu and Barbara's wedding.

Cast
 Lloyd Nolan as Stuart Woodrow
 Doris Davenport as Barbara Shaw
 Frank Albertson as Jeff Flavin
 Robert Armstrong as Vic Archer
 Paul Harvey as Dist. Atty. Hardin S. Kelly
 Charles Halton as Neil Saunders
 Eddie Conrad as Enrico
 Harry Tyler as Monroe
 Dick Elliott as Foster
 Archie Twitchell as Reporter
 Veda Ann Borg as Bessie
 Milton Parsons as Eddie

References

External links
 

1940 films
1940 drama films
American drama films
1940s English-language films
American black-and-white films
Republic Pictures films
Films directed by Joseph Santley
Films produced by Robert North
1940s American films